Brad Noffsinger (born August 29, 1960) is an American professional stock car racing driver and crew chief. Now retired as a driver, he formerly competed in the NASCAR Winston Cup Series and Busch Series; following his stock car racing career, he served as a crew chief in the Winston Cup Series and has competed in USAC open-wheel competition.

Personal life
Noffsinger has two younger brothers and grew up with a passion for toy cars.

Racing career
He attempted to qualify in 1987 for the 1987 Winston Western 500 but failed to do so. During the 1988 NASCAR Winston Cup Series, Noffsinger would fail to qualify eight different times. His ambitions to race in the highest level of American stock car racing was ultimately marred by seven DNFs.

During the 1994 Cup Series season, he would attempt to qualify at the 1994 Mello Yello 500, the 1994 AC-Delco 500 and the 1994 Slick 50 500. None of these attempts resulted in qualifying for the race.

Road courses were Noffsinger's specialties; where he would finish an average of 15th place. His Achilles heel was at most intermediate tracks where a finish of 30th place was considered to be typical.

Following his racing career, Noffsinger became a crew chief at the NASCAR Winston Cup level, working with Team Sabco during the mid-to-late 1990s.

Post-NASCAR career
After retiring from NASCAR for good, Noffsinger joined the personnel of the Richard Petty Driving Experience at Walt Disney World Speedway where he teaches casual tourists and NASCAR fans alike how to operate the four-gear manual transmission stock cars. He has been employed with this organization for several years and continues to serve his role as an instructor there.

From 1999 to 2004, Noffsinger became an owner/occasional driver at the USAC Silver Crown; where he competes and helps younger driver learn the race car driving trade. The team folded up due to financial issues.

In 2013, Noffsinger served as the stunt driver for the viral video Pepsi MAX & Jeff Gordon Present: Test Drive.

Motorsports career results

NASCAR
(key) (Bold – Pole position awarded by qualifying time. Italics – Pole position earned by points standings or practice time. * – Most laps led.)

Winston Cup Series

Busch Series

References

External links
 
 

Living people
1960 births
Sportspeople from Huntington Beach, California
Racing drivers from California
NASCAR drivers
NASCAR crew chiefs
USAC Silver Crown Series drivers
World of Outlaws drivers